Arabesque is a style of Turkish music popular in Turkey, the Balkans, the Caucasus, Middle East and Eastern Europe. The genre was particularly popular in Turkey from the 1960s through the 2000s. Its aesthetics have evolved over the decades and into the 2010s. Its melodies are influenced especially by Arab Music, Balkan music, Iranian music and Caucasian music; it often includes the bağlama and Ottoman forms of oriental and middle eastern music. Arabesque music are mostly in a minor key, typically in varieties of the Phrygian mode; it heavily features themes that tend to focus on issues of longing, strife and desire.

Description and history
A very small percentage of Arabesque is exclusively instrumental. For the great majority of it, a singer lies at the center of the music. Male singers dominated the genre in its early years, but female singers probably predominated during its peak years of popularity. Simultaneously with the influx of female singers, the sound grew more dancey and upbeat.

Suat Sayın is generally considered the founder of the genre. Other well known older singers are Ferdi Tayfur, Müslüm Gürses and Hakkı Bulut. One of the most prolific and commercially successful is İbrahim Tatlıses, who broke all sales records in Turkey in 1978 and continues to turn out popular music to this day. He has maintained popularity in the Arabesk scene in recent years through remixing his tracks into dance-friendly club tracks. The pure Arabesque album “Acıların Kadını” (tr: woman of pains) by the singer Bergen was the bestselling album in Turkey in 1986 and may be fairly labelled one of the classic albums of the genre. Bergen had several other hit Arabesque albums during the 1980s. Other singers include Ebru Gündeş, Seda Sayan, and Sibel Can. The singers Muazzez Ersoy and Bülent Ersoy designate themselves as modern exponents of Ottoman classical music. Zerrin Özer also made Arabesque albums between 1982 and 1988, including her album named “Mutluluklar Dilerim” released in 1984. One of the important names of Arabesque musician died in 2000 was Ahmet Kaya and another of the names died in 2012 was Azer Bülbül. Another of the important names of Arabesque musician died in 2017 was İbrahim Erkal.

A common theme in Arabesque songs is the highly embellished and agonizing depiction of love and yearning, along with unrequited love, grief and pain. This theme had undertones of class differences in early 1960-70s, during which most of the genre's followers — mostly working class to lower middle class — identified themselves with. Turkish composer Fazıl Say has repeatedly condemned and criticized Arabesque genre, equating the practice of listening to Arabesque “tantamount to treason”.[why?]

See also
Kanto
Skiladiko
Mizrahi music
Filmi
Longa (Middle Eastern music)

References

External links

"Crossing The Bridge" (documentary film) on IMDb
"Arabic Music"
"The arabesk debate: music and musicians in modern Turkey" by Martin Stokes on Google Books

20th-century music genres
Folk
Middle Eastern culture
Turkish culture
Middle Eastern music
World music genres
Folk music genres